Chilton Medical Center is a non-profit community hospital in Pompton Plains, New Jersey.  Located at 97 West Parkway, it is the only hospital serving the Pequannock Township area. In 2021 it was given a grade A by the Leapfrog patient safety organization.

History

"Old Chilton"
In 1947, Forrest S. Chilton, Jr., M. D. and his wife, Elizabeth, a registered nurse, donated land located on Newark-Pompton Turnpike with the vision of building a hospital. At the time, Chilton was the only doctor in the area and was operating a maternity ward in his home's attic. 

During its infancy, Chilton obtained funding from his business associate Aniello Vitale, and raised additional capital from the community and patients [?] by soliciting donations door to door, via a contribution jar in his office and contributing from his own income. In 1954, the facility opened with fifty beds, named in honor of his son, Forrest S. Chilton III, who died in World War II.

In 1961, it was expanded to a 119-bed facility.

Some people who remember or were born in the Newark-Pompton Turnpike building, which has since been turned into condominiums, affectionately refer to the original location by the nickname "The Old Chilton."

New York Yankees shortstop Derek Jeter was born at "Old Chilton" on June 26, 1974.
C.W.C LLC Founder Clint Wiest was born in the "Old Chilton" on April 3, 1967

Second facility
On November 20, 1971 a second facility was dedicated on West Parkway, where Chilton Medical Center still operates today.

Both buildings were used concurrently until 1984

The current facility on West Parkway houses 260 beds.

Mobile Intensive Care Unit (MICU)
Chilton Medical Center operates two advanced life support paramedic units and two basic life support ambulances. ALS 901 operates 24 hours a day while ALS 902 operates a 12-hour-a-day schedule (7a-7p).  The ALS units operate out of two bases, one located on the hospital's property, the other in West Milford. BLS 931 operates from 6am- 6pm and BLS 932 operate from 7AM-7PM.  Both BLS units are in service Monday through Friday and are stationed at the hospital.  Chilton MICU's 200 + square miles of primary coverage represents the largest response area in the MICCOM consortium, with the department responding to over 5,000 calls per year for ALS.  The BLS units respond to calls primarily for the town of Pequannock, but do provide mutual aid for surrounding town (Lincoln Park, Pompton Lakes, Riverdale, Wanaque, Ringwood, West Milford, Kinnelon, Butler, Bloomingdale).

As of January 1, 2014, Chilton's EMS services were transferred under the control of Atlantic Ambulance Corporation.

References

Hospital buildings completed in 1954
Hospital buildings completed in 1961
Hospital buildings completed in 1971
Hospitals in New Jersey
Hospitals established in 1947
1947 establishments in New Jersey